Telepathy is the purported transmission of information between people without using known sensory channels or physical interaction.

Telepathy may also refer to:

 Telepathy (software), a software framework
 KDE Telepathy, a front-end for Telepathy
 Telepathy (Cindy Blackman album), 1992
 Telepathy, an album by Deborah Allen, 1987
 Telepathy (He Xuntian), a 1987 work for symphony orchestra composed by He Xuntian

Songs 
 "Telepathy" (song), by Christina Aguilera from the soundtrack of The Get Down, 2016
 "Telepathy", by BTS from Be, 2020
 "Telepathy", by Eddy Grant from Going for Broke, 1984
 "Telepathy", by Lene Lovich from Stateless, 1978
 "Telepathy", by Men Without Hats from No Hats Beyond This Point, 2003

See also
 Telepathe, an electronic band
 "Telepatía", a 2020 song by Kali Uchis